Bulgaria competed at the 1988 Summer Olympics in Seoul, South Korea. Bulgaria ranked 5th overall by medal count with 35 medals won. 171 competitors, 104 men and 67 women, took part in 120 events in 16 sports. The nation returned to the Olympic Games after boycotting the 1984 Summer Olympics.

Medalists

Competitors
The following is the list of number of competitors in the Games.

Athletics

Men
Track & road events

Field events

Women
Track & road events

Field events

Combined events – Heptathlon

Basketball

Women's tournament

Team roster

Group play

Classification 5–8

Classification 5/6

Boxing

Men

Canoeing

Sprint
Men

Women

Fencing

Five fencers, all men, represented Bulgaria in 1988.

Men

Individual

Team

Gymnastics

Artistic
Men

Individual finals

Women

Individual finals

Rhythmic gymnastics

Judo

Men

Rowing

Men

Women

Shooting

Men

Women

Swimming

Men

Women

Table tennis

Men

Group E

Women

Group G

Round of 16
Chen Jing (CHN) - Daniela Guergueltcheva (BUL) 3:0 21–15, 21–7, 22–20

Tennis

Women

Volleyball

Preliminary round

Pool A

|}

|}

5th–8th semifinals

|}

5th place match

|}

Team Roster
Kostadin Mitev
Petyo Draguiev
Borislav Kyossev
Ljubomir Ganev
Ilian Kaziiski
Dimo Tonev
Petko Petkov
Plamen Khristov
Sava Kovatchev
Nayden Naydenov
Miltcho Milanov
Zvetan Florov
Head coach: Todor Piperkov

Weightlifting

Men

Wrestling

Men's freestyle

Men's Greco-Roman

References

Nations at the 1988 Summer Olympics
1988
Olympics